Stefan D. Anker is Head of Field “Tissue Homeostasis and Cachexia" at Charité University, Berlin, Germany. Previously, he was Professor of Innovative Clinical Trials at University Medical Center Göttingen in Germany. The main focus of the Innovative Clinical Trials department was research in the field of chronic heart failure, including the development and clinical testing of new therapies.

He studied medicine at Charité Medical School of Humboldt-University Berlin, Germany (1987-1993) and completed his PhD at the National Heart and Lung Institute of Imperial College London, United Kingdom, in 1998. Since then, he has had teaching appointments in several countries (UK, Germany, Australia, Italy).

His particular research interests include the pathophysiology and treatment of acute and chronic heart failure (CHF), cardiac device therapy, clinical evaluation of cardiovascular biomarkers, pathophysiology of muscle wasting, cachexia therapy in CHF, ageing, sarcopenia and cancer.

Anker is a member of and serves on the Boards of several academic organisations. He serves on the editorial boards of five scientific journals (including European Heart Journal and European Journal of Heart Failure). He is founding Editor-in-Chief of the Journal of Cachexia, Sarcopenia and Muscle and of ESC Heart Failure, which is the first open access heart failure journal.

Anker has won several prizes (including two American Heart Association Young Investigator Awards), and has obtained a number of fellowships and grants, including two National Institutes of Health (NIH) grants (Warfarin Versus Aspirin in Reduced Cardiac Ejection Fraction (WARCEF) Trial), two grants from the EU's Seventh Framework Programme for Research (FP7), and one Innovative Medicines Initiative / Horizon 2020 grant.

Memberships 
Anker has been a member of the German Cardiac Society and of the European Society of Cardiology (ESC) since 1995. He is currently vice president of the ESC in charge of National Cardiac Societies and Communications. He has been serving on the board of the ESC since 2012. In addition, he has been serving on the board of the Heart Failure Association (HFA) of the ESC since 2006. He was HFA President between 2012 and 2014 and he currently chairs the HFA committee on regulatory affairs.

Anker is the founding president of the International Society on Sarcopenia, Cachexia and Wasting Disorders (SCWD).

Publications 
Anker has authored more than 700 original papers, reviews, and editorials. Total citations exceed 46,000, including over 50 papers with more than 200 citations. He has an h-index of 104. Main topics are heart failure, chronic disease, cachexia and biological markers.

Selected bibliography

Consensus meetings and guidelines 
Anker has participated in and chaired several consensus meeting and guidelines committees:
 Chair, ESPEN Guidelines on Parenteral Nutrition: on cardiology and pneumology. (Anker et al., Clin Nutr 2009)
 Co-chair, Consensus Group “The definition of Cachexia” (Evans et al., Clinical Nutrition 2008)
 AHA Consensus Group “State of the science: promoting self-care in persons with heart failure: a scientific statement from the American Heart Association.” (Riegel et al., Circulation 2009)
 ADQI 7 Consensus Group “Cardio-Renal Syndromes” (Ronco et al., Eur Heart J 2010)
 Co-chair, Consensus Group “Endpoints for Cachexia Trials & Nutrition for Cachexia and Sarcopenia” (Morley et al., JAMDA 2010)
 Nutritional recommendations for the management of sarcopenia. Co-chair. (Morley el al., JAMDA 2010)
 “Definition and classification of cancer cachexia” (Fearon et al. Lancet Oncol 2011)
 ESC/HFA Guideline on Diagnosis & treatment of acute and chronic heart failure (McMurray et al., EHJ 2012)
 HFA/WGTE of ESC Consensus on thromboembolism & anti-thrombotic therapy in heart failure with sinus rhythm (Lip et al. Eur J HF 2012)
 ESH/ESC Guidelines for the management of arterial hypertension. Reviewer. (Mancia et al. EHJ 2013)
 ESC/EASD Guidelines on diabetes, pre-diabetes, and cardiovascular diseases. (Ryden et al. EHJ 2013)
 SC/ESA 2014 Guidelines on non-cardiac surgery: cardiovascular assessment and management. (Kristensen et al. EHJ 2014)
 Reporting on patient reported outcomes in cardiovascular trials – Position statement of the ESC cardiovascular round table. (Anker et al. EHJ 2014)
 ESC/HFA Guideline on Diagnosis & treatment of acute and chronic heart failure (Ponikowski et al., EHJ 2016)
 Co-chair, Consensus Group “International Cachexia Definition – Update 2016” (ongoing)

Research 
Stefan Anker has been a member of more than 30 international clinical trial steering committees, chairing or co-chairing more than 10 (including the FAIR-HF, TIM-HF, BACH, AUGMENT-HF, ACT-ONE, RESHAPE-HF2, IMPULSE-HF, FAIR-HF2, Fair-HFpEF, EMPORER-HFpEF trials). He served in several data and safety monitoring boards (chairing five) and end-point committees (chairing three). In 2015 and again in 2016, he was named in the Thomson Reuters Highly Cited Researchers list.

Honors and awards 

 22/10/1998: "Ehrenmedalie der Charité Berlin" (honorary medal of Charité Medical School, Berlin)
 11/1998: Runner-up; Samuel A. Levine Young Investigator Award [YIA] (Clinical Cardiology) of the AHA for the paper: Niebauer J, Poole-Wilson PA, Coats AJS, Anker SD. Endotoxin and immune activation in chronic heart failure: proof of concept.
 3/1999: 2nd Prize; Young Investigator Award (Clinical Cardiology) of the ACC for the paper: Ponikowski P, Anker SD, Coats AJS. Oscilatory breathing patterns during the wakefulness in patients with chronic heart failure: clinical and prognostic implications.
 8/2000: 3rd Prize; YIA Clinical Cardiology of the European Society of Cardiology for the paper: Anker SD, Negassa A, Coats AJS, Poole-Wilson PA, Yusuf S. Prognostic importance of weight loss in chronic heart failure and the impact of treatment with ACE inhibitors.
 11/2000: 1st Prize; Samuel A. Levine Young Investigator Award (Clinical Cardiology) for the AHA for the paper: Sharma R, Coats AJS, Anker SD. Cellular endotoxin desensitization in patients with severe chronic heart failure.
 2/2001: GlaxoSmithKline Respiratory Clinical Research Award (£38,358)
 5/2006: Animal protection research prize (22,000 EUR) (together with Dr. Springer)
 11/2006: 1st Prize; Samuel A. Levine Young Investigator Award (Clinical Cardiology) for the AHA for the paper: Okonko D, Poole-Wilson PA, Anker SD, Ponikowski P. Intravenous iron therapy in patients with chronic heart failure with and without anemia
 6/2007: 1st Prize; Young Investigator Award of the European HF Association for the paper: Okonko D, Anker SD, Poole-Wilson PA. Epo and inflammatory cytokines in patients with chronic heart failure – mechanistic studies.
 10/2011: Storz German Telemedicine Award 2011 for TIM-HF (together with Prof. Köhler)
25/10/2018 : Prof. Dr. Stefan Anker  and Prof. Dr. Piotr Ponikowski from Wrocław Medical University have received the 2018 Copernicus Award from the Deutsche Forschungsgemeinschaft (DFG, German Research Foundation) and the Fundacja na rzecz Nauki Polskiej (FNP, Foundation for Polish Science) for their services to German-Polish research collaboration. The jury appointed jointly by the DFG and the FNP selected the two researchers for their long-standing and distinguished collaboration in heart failure research. Their contributions are considered to have led to a better understanding of the pathophysiology of heart failure as well as new treatment strategies for the disease. The Copernicus Award was presented on 25 October 2018 in Berlin by the presidents of the DFG and the FNP, Prof. Dr. Peter Strohschneider and Prof. Dr. Maciej Żylicz.

References 

1965 births
Living people
German cardiologists